A growing body of research has begun to highlight differences in the way racial and ethnic groups respond to psychiatric medication.

It has been noted that there are "dramatic cross-ethnic and cross-national variations in the dosing practices and side-effect profiles in response to practically all classes of psychotropics."

Differences in drug metabolism

Drug metabolism is controlled by a number of specific enzymes, and the action of these enzymes varies among individuals. For example, most individuals show normal activity of the IID6 isoenzyme that is responsible for the metabolism of many tricyclic antidepressant medications and most antipsychotic drugs. However, studies have found that one-third of Asian Americans and African Americans have a genetic alteration that decreases the metabolic rate of the IID6 isoenzyme, leading to a greater risk of side effects and toxicity. The CYP2D6 enzyme, important for the way in which the liver clears many drugs from the body, varies greatly between individuals in ways that can be ethnically specific.  
Though enzyme activity is genetically influenced, it can also be altered by cultural and environmental factors such as diet, the use of other medications, alcohol and disease states.

Differences in pharmacodynamics
If two individuals have the same blood level of a medication there may still be differences in the way that the body responds due to pharmacodynamic differences; pharmacodynamic responses may also be influenced by racial and cultural factors.

In addition to biology and environment, culturally determined attitudes toward illness may affect how an individual responds to psychiatric medication.

Cultural factors

In addition to biology and environment, culturally determined attitudes toward illness and its treatment may affect how an individual responds to psychiatric medication. Some cultures see suffering and illness as unavoidable and not amenable to medication, while others treat symptoms with polypharmacy, often mixing medications with herbal drugs. Cultural differences may have an effect on adherence to medication regimes as well as influence the placebo effect.

Further, the way an individual expresses and reacts to the symptoms of psychiatric illness, and the cultural expectations of the physician, may affect the diagnosis a patient receives. For example, bipolar disorder often is misdiagnosed as schizophrenia in people of color.

Recommendations for research and practice

The differential response of many ethnic minorities to certain psychiatric medications raises important concerns for both research and practice.

Include Ethnic Groups. Most studies of psychiatric medications have white male subjects. Because there is often a greater difference within racial and ethnic groups than between them, researchers must be certain they choose prototypical representatives of these groups, or use a larger random sample.

Further, because broad racial and ethnic groups have many different subgroups. For example, in North American research it may not be enough to characterize individuals as Asian, Hispanic, Native American, or African American. Even within the same ethnic group, there are no reliable measures to determine important cultural differences.

"Start Low and Go Slow." Individuals who receive a higher dose of psychiatric medication than needed may discontinue treatment because of side effects, or they may develop toxic levels that lead to serious complications. A reasonable approach to prescribing medication to any psychiatric patient, regardless of race or culture, is to "start low and go slow".

Someday there may be a simple blood test to predict how an individual will respond to a specific class of drugs; research in these fields fall in the domain of pharmacogenomics and pharmacometabolomics.

See also
Pharmacognosy
Race and health

References

External links
 Culture and Ethnicity, National Mental Health Information Center

Pharmacokinetics
Ethnobiology
Psychopharmacology
Race and health